The Courthouse Plaza Historic District is a historic district in Prescott, Arizona that was listed on the U.S. National Register of Historic Places (NRHP) in 1978.

It includes 26 contributing buildings including the Yavapai County Courthouse (already separately listed on the NRHP) and the Masonic Temple, in a  area.

The most significant buildings are:
Bank of Arizona Building
Knights of Pythias Building
Prescott National Bank Building
Levy Building
Palace Hotel
St. Michael Hotel
Masonic Temple (1907), three-story  building with colossal columns, pilasters, and pediment
Goldwater Mercantile
Electric Building

Gallery

References

Commercial buildings on the National Register of Historic Places in Arizona
Victorian architecture in Arizona
Geography of Yavapai County, Arizona
Historic districts on the National Register of Historic Places in Arizona
National Register of Historic Places in Prescott, Arizona
Courthouses on the National Register of Historic Places in Arizona